Skipskop is a town in  Overberg District Municipality in the Western Cape province of South Africa.

Village west of Arniston (Waenhuiskrans). Afrikaans for ‘ships’ cliff’, it was so named after the number of ships wrecked there.

References

Populated places in the Cape Agulhas Local Municipality